Krasny Pakhar is a rural locality (a village) in Utyashevsky Selsoviet, Belokataysky District, Bashkortostan, Russia. The population was 130 as of 2010. There is 1 street.

Geography 
Krasny Pakhar is located 10 km southeast of Novobelokatay (the district's administrative centre) by road. Urakovo is the nearest rural locality.

References 

Rural localities in Belokataysky District